Brant's Volunteers, also known as Joseph Brant's Volunteers, were an irregular unit of Loyalist and indigenous volunteers raised during the American Revolutionary War by Mohawk war leader, Joseph Brant (Mohawk: Thayendanegea), who fought on the side of the British on the frontier of New York. Being military associators, they were not provided soldiers' uniforms, weapons, or pay by the British government, and survived by foraging and plundering.

Formation and History

Brant began recruiting Mohawk and Loyalist volunteers in 1777 from his base at Onaquaga.
The initial size of his guerrilla company was about 100 men. About 20 were Mohawk allies of the British, and about 80 were Loyalists. Later in the war, Brant was able to attract a larger number of indigeneous warriors to his unit, which grew to over 300 members. The Loyalists were mostly of English, Scottish, and Irish descent recruited from the upper Susquehanna and Delaware river valleys.

Although Brant received a captain's commission in the Six Nations Indian Department, other members of the group were Loyalist associators (volunteers).  They were not paid by the British, and relied upon plunder and foraging for their compensation. Brant often needed to purchase supplies for his volunteers on credit. In 1779, Governor Frederick Haldimand authorized clothing, rations, and medical care, but no monetary payments. Since the unit had no official recognition, many members later transferred to Butler's Rangers or the King's Royal Regiment of New York. 

Brant's Volunteers participated in the 1777 Siege of Fort Stanwix and the Battle of Oriskany. They fought in 1778 at the Battle of Cobleskill and the Attack on German Flatts, and were present during the Cherry Valley Massacre. Following the destruction of Onaquaga by Lieutenant Colonel William Butler in October 1778, Brant moved his base of operations to Fort Niagara.

In 1779, Brant's Volunteers defeated the American militia at the Battle of Minisink, but were brushed aside by the Continental Army at the Battle of Newtown. In 1780, Brant and his volunteers destroyed Kanonwalohale, the principal village of the pro-American Oneidas, and participated in a large scale raid on the Schoharie Creek and Mohawk River valleys that culminated in the inconclusive Battle of Klock's Field. The following year Brant operated in the Ohio Country and in August participated in a successful ambush of a detachment of Brigadier General George Rogers Clark's army.

Uniforms
Lacking uniforms, Joseph Brant's volunteers frequently dressed and painted themselves as indigenous warriors. When they wore civilian attire in battle, Brant had them attach yellow lace to their hats so they could be easily identified as Loyalists.

Post-War
By late 1783, just 15 Loyalists remained with Brant's Volunteers. Many of them later settled with Joseph Brant and the Mohawk on the reserve established in 1784 along the Grand River in what is now Ontario.

References

New York (state) in the American Revolution
Loyalist military units in the American Revolution
Native Americans in the American Revolution